Hırkatepe is a village in the District of Beypazarı, Ankara Province, Turkey.

Gazi Gündüzalp, the grandfather of Osman I, the founder of the Ottoman Empire, is buried in the village.

References

Villages in Beypazarı District